Xanthoporus is a genus of fungi, belonging to the family Steccherinaceae.

The genus was described in 2010 by Audet.

The genus has cosmopolitan distribution.

Species:
 Xanthoporus syringae

References

Steccherinaceae
Polyporales genera